Alfalfa's Double is an Our Gang short comedy film directed by Edward Cahn.  It was the 186th Our Gang short (187th episode, 98th talking short, 99th talking episode, and 18th MGM produced episode) that was released.

Plot
Alfalfa comes face to face with his wealthy lookalike Cornelius (also played by Carl Switzer). This fateful meeting provides a golden opportunity for both boys: By trading places with his double, Alfalfa will be able to weasel out of his yard work and live a life of luxury, while Cornelius will be able to escape the rigors of dancing lessons, baths, and the like, and briefly enjoy the benefits of being a "regular kid." But the consequences of the boys' identity-trading serves only to lend credence to the old saying "Stay in your own backyard." Alfalfa is not used to the dancing lessons, formal meals, having to behave like a gentleman, minding table manners (where his meal is taken away and replaced with an artichoke), reading lessons, and an afternoon nap. Cornelius fares as bad when he has yardwork to do and finds that the rough play is not for him. In the end they secretly switch back and Alfalfa comes back to a messy yard that the gang cleaned up earlier but messed up due to the lack of help from his double.

Cast

The Gang
 Carl Switzer as Alfalfa/Cornelius
 Mickey Gubitosi (later known as Robert Blake) as Mickey
 Darla Hood as Darla
 George McFarland as Spanky
 Billie Thomas as Buckwheat
 Leonard Landy as Leonard

Additional cast
 Barbara Bedford as Alfalfa's mother
 Hank Mann as Railroad attendant
 Anne O'Niel as Governess
 Milton Parsons as Willoughby

See also
Our Gang filmography

References

External links

1940 films
1940 comedy films
American black-and-white films
Films directed by Edward L. Cahn
Metro-Goldwyn-Mayer short films
Our Gang films
1940 short films
Films about lookalikes
1940s American films